Jaan Reinberg (1872–?) was an Estonian politician. He was a member of I Riigikogu. On 5 April 1921, he resigned his position and he was replaced by Jaan Kurgemaa.

References

1872 births
Year of death missing
Central Committee of Tallinn Trade Unions politicians
Members of the Riigikogu, 1920–1923